Ravenna Cathedral is a Roman Catholic cathedral dedicated to the Resurrection of Jesus Christ in the city of Ravenna, Italy. Formerly the archiepiscopal seat of the Archdiocese of Ravenna, it is now the seat of the archbishops of Ravenna-Cervia. 

It was granted the status of a minor basilica by Pope John XXIII on 7 October 1960. It is the seat of the parish of San Giovanni in Fonte belonging to the Urban Vicariate of the archdiocese of Ravenna-Cervia.

History 

The present 18th-century Baroque building was built following the demolition of the ancient cathedral, the early 5th-century Basilica Ursiana.

On the top of the belltower there are four bells in chord of D minor.

References

Roman Catholic churches in Ravenna
18th-century architecture
Roman Catholic cathedrals in Italy
Basilica churches in Ravenna
Cathedrals in Emilia-Romagna